Stefan Rahmstorf (born 22 February 1960) is a German oceanographer and climatologist. Since 2000, he has been a Professor of Physics of the Oceans at Potsdam University. He studied physical oceanography at Bangor University and received his Ph.D. in oceanography from Victoria University of Wellington (1990). His work focuses on the role of ocean currents in climate change. He was one of the lead authors of the IPCC Fourth Assessment Report.

Public role 
Rahmstorf is a co-founder of the blog Real Climate, which has been described by Nature as one of the top-5 science blogs in 2006, and included among the 15 best environmental websites by Time in 2008. He also co-founded the German blog KlimaLounge. KlimaLounge won the 3rd prize of the science blog award of 2013. He is a frequent contributor of articles on climate and climate change/global warming in the popular press, some of which are internationally syndicated via Project Syndicate. He writes a regular column in the German environmental magazine Zeo2, and has published the children's science book Wolken, Wind und Wetter (Clouds, Wind, and Weather) on weather and climate. The book was selected as Environmental Book of the Month for January 2012 by the Deutsche Umweltstiftung. In addition, it was later voted Environmental Book of the Year 2012.

Rahmstorf has commented on climate change and climate policy on TV and radio. He was portrayed as one of the world's 10 leading climate scientists by the Financial Times in 2009. The ARD presented a portrait of Rahmstorf in their prime news magazine Tagesthemen when he received the Deutscher Umweltmedienpreis (German Environmental Media Award) in 2007.

Work 
The University of Flensburg found that among all climate scientists from Germany, Rahmstorf published the largest number of studies which ranked amongst the most-cited in the scientific literature during the years 1994–2013. Rahmstorf was a member of the German Advisory Council on Global Change (WBGU) from 2004 till 2013.

Awards and honors
Climate Communication Prize of the American Geophysical Union (2017).
Fellow of the American Geophysical Union (2010)
Along with other authors of the IPCC AR4 report, he was honored by the award of the 2007 Nobel Peace Prize to the IPCC, shared with Al Gore.
Honorary Fellow of the University of Wales (2007)
German Environmental Media Award (Deutscher Umweltmedienpreis), for his work on scientific accurate reporting anthropogenic climate change and impacts (2007)
Centennial Fellowship Award from the James S. McDonnell Foundation, research grant of $1 million (1999)

Selected publications
An overview of Rahmstorf's publications can be found at his Google Scholar profile.

References

External links
 Stefan Rahmstorf's blog at KlimaLounge
 Personal website
 Climate-science blog with contributions from Stefan Rahmstorf
 Interview with Stefan Rahmstorf about Climate Deniers and Climate Myths

1960 births
Living people
Fellows of the American Geophysical Union
German climatologists
German environmentalists
German oceanographers
Intergovernmental Panel on Climate Change lead authors
Victoria University of Wellington alumni
Environmental bloggers
Academic staff of the University of Potsdam
Climate activists
Climate communication